Polska Liga Koszykówki (PLK) (English: Polish Basketball League) is a professional men's club basketball league in Poland. It constitutes the first and highest-tier level of the Polish league pyramid. The winning team of the final round are crowned the Polish Champions of that season. It began in 1947–48, with the name of I Liga, and was originally organized by the Polish Basketball Federation. The league changed to its current form, beginning with the 1997–98 season, after the Polska Liga Koszykówki SA, PLK SA (the Polish Basketball League Joint-stock company) took control over the league (the PLK SA was created in 1995). In 2000–01 season the league turned professional.

The PLK, which is played under FIBA rules, currently consists of 16 teams. A PLK season is split into a league stage and a playoffs stage (since 1984–85 season). At the end of the league stage, the top eight teams qualify for the playoff stage.

The competition Polish basketball men's championships has existed since the year 1928. Śląsk Wrocław is the record holder for most titles, with 18.

Śląsk Wrocław are defending champions.

Naming and logos
Due to sponsorship reasons, the league has known several names:

Teams

Medalists

Records and statistics
Most seasons:
Śląsk Wrocław (56)
Single game scoring record:
90 –  Mieczysław Młynarski (10 December 1982: Górnik Wałbrzych – Pogoń Szczecin)
All-Time Scoring leaders:
{| class="wikitable"
|- bgcolor="#CCCCCC"
! 
! Player
! 
! 
|- align="center"
| align="center"| 1.
| align="center"| Eugeniusz Kijewski
| align="center"| 10,185
| align="center"| 395
|- align="center" style="background:#eeeeee"
| align="center"| 2.
| align="center"| Adam Wójcik
| align="center"| 10,097
| align="center"| 651
|- align="center"
| align="center"| 3.
| align="center"| Edward Jurkiewicz
| align="center"| 9,832
| align="center"| 306
|- align="center" style="background:#eeeeee"
| align="center"| 4.
| align="center"| Jerzy Binkowski
| align="center"| 9,204
| align="center"| 586
|- align="center"
| align="center"| 5.
| align="center"| Mieczysław Młynarski
| align="center"| 9,026
| align="center"| 357
|- align="center" style="background:#eeeeee"
| align="center"| 6.
| align="center"| Mariusz Bacik
| align="center"| 8,706
| align="center"| 627
|- align="center"
| align="center"| 7.
| align="center"| Maciej Zieliński
| align="center"| 8,650
| align="center"| 579
|- align="center" style="background:#eeeeee"
| align="center"| 8.
| align="center"| Andrzej Pluta
| align="center"| 8,512
| align="center"| 591
|- align="center"
| align="center"| 9.
| align="center"| Henryk Wardach
| align="center"| 8,163
| align="center"| 557
|- align="center" style="background:#eeeeee"
| align="center"| 10.
| align="center"| Dominik Tomczyk
| align="center"| 8,008
| align="center"| 556
|- align="center"
| align="center"| 11.
| align="center"| Jarosław Jechorek
| align="center"| 7,681
| align="center"| 489
|- align="center" style="background:#eeeeee"
| align="center"| 12.
| align="center"| Dariusz Zelig
| align="center"| 7,481
| align="center"| 420
|- align="center"
| align="center"| 13.
| align="center"| Eugeniusz Durejko
| align="center"| 7,048
| align="center"| 365
|- align="center" style="background:#eeeeee"
| align="center"| 14.
| align="center"| Jarosław Marcinkowski
| align="center"| 6,979
| align="center"| 499
|- align="center"
| align="center"| 15.
| align="center"| Jarosław Zyskowski
| align="center"| 6,774
| align="center"| 484
|}
Highest attendance in a game:
10,152 – Trefl Sopot vs Asseco Prokom Gdynia, at Ergo Arena on 14 April 2012

Individual awards
After the end of each season, individual honors are given to the best performing players of a season. A select group of press members vote for the winners of individual awards.

Most Valuable Player
Finals MVP
Top Scorer
Best Defender
Rookie of the Year (defunct)
Best Coach
All-PLK Team
Best Young Player

List of Polish basketball champions

 1928: Czarna Trzynastka Poznań
 1929: Cracovia
 1930: AZS Poznań
 1931: AZS Poznań
 1932: AZS Poznań
 1933: YMCA Kraków
 1934: YMCA Kraków
 1935: KPW Poznań
 1936: Not played due to the 1936 Summer Olympics.
 1937: AZS Poznań
 1938: Cracovia
 1939: KPW Poznań
 1940: Not played due to World War II.
 1941: Not played due to World War II.
 1942: Not played due to World War II.
 1943: Not played due to World War II.
 1944: Not played due to World War II.
 1945: Not played due to World War II.
 1946: KKS Poznań
 1947: AZS Warszawa
 1948: YMCA Łódź
 1949: ZZK Poznań
 1950: Spójnia Łódź
 1951: Kolejarz Poznań
 1952: Spójnia Łódź
 1953: Włókniarz Łódź
 1954: Gwardia Kraków
 1955: Kolejarz Poznań
 1956: CWKS Warszawa
 1957: Legia Warszawa
 1958: Lech Poznań
 1959: Polonia Warszawa
 1960: Legia Warszawa
 1961: Legia Warszawa
 1962: Wisła Kraków
 1963: Legia Warszawa
 1964: Wisła Kraków
 1965: Śląsk Wrocław
 1966: Legia Warszawa
 1967: AZS Warszawa
 1968: Wisła Kraków
 1969: Legia Warszawa
 1970: Śląsk Wrocław
 1971: Wybrzeże Gdańsk
 1972: Wybrzeże Gdańsk
 1973: Wybrzeże Gdańsk
 1974: Wisła Kraków
 1975: Resovia Rzeszów
 1976: Wisła Kraków
 1977: Śląsk Wrocław
 1978: Wybrzeże Gdańsk
 1979: Śląsk Wrocław
 1980: Śląsk Wrocław
 1981: Śląsk Wrocław
 1982: Górnik Wałbrzych
 1983: Lech Poznań
 1984: Lech Poznań
 1985: Zagłębie Sosnowiec
 1986: Zagłębie Sosnowiec
 1987: Śląsk Wrocław
 1988: Górnik Wałbrzych
 1989: Lech Poznań
 1990: Lech Poznań
 1991: Śląsk Wrocław
 1992: PCS Śląsk Wrocław
 1993: PCS Śląsk Wrocław
 1994: Śląsk Wrocław
 1995: Mazowszanka Pruszków
 1996: Śląsk Eska Wrocław
 1997: Mazowszanka PEKAES Pruszków
 1998: Zepter Śląsk Wrocław
 1999: Zepter Śląsk Wrocław
 2000: Zepter Śląsk Wrocław
 2001: Zepter Śląsk Wrocław
 2002: Idea Śląsk Wrocław
 2003: Anwil Włocławek
 2004: Prokom Trefl Sopot
 2005: Prokom Trefl Sopot
 2006: Prokom Trefl Sopot
 2007: Prokom Trefl Sopot
 2008: Prokom Trefl Sopot
 2009: Asseco Prokom Sopot
 2010: Asseco Prokom Gdynia
 2011: Asseco Prokom Gdynia
 2012: Asseco Prokom Gdynia
 2013: Stelmet Zielona Góra
 2014: PGE Turów Zgorzelec
 2015: Stelmet Zielona Góra
 2016: Stelmet Zielona Góra
 2017: Stelmet Zielona Góra
 2018: Anwil Włocławek
 2019: Anwil Włocławek
 2020: Stelmet Enea BC Zielona Góra
 2021: Arged BM Slam Stal Ostrów Wielkopolski
 2022: Śląsk Wrocław

See also
 Basketball in Poland
 Polish basketball league system
 I Liga (basketball)
 Basket Liga Kobiet
 Polish Basketball Cup
 Polish Basketball Supercup
 Polish Basketball Federation

Notes

References

External links
  
 Polish League at Eurobasket.com

 
Basketball leagues in Poland
1995 establishments in Poland
Sports leagues established in 1995
Professional sports leagues in Poland